Good Americans is Killradio's first studio release in four years. Jasten King has since left the band, and has begun playing in Nancy Fullforce along with Duke, who still remains in Killradio as well. It will have a Mid September under Nine 12 Records and will feature some acoustic versions of old songs like 'Feeding The Rich" or "Where Go We."

Track listing
All songs written by Killradio
"Rebel"
"Good Americans"
"Peace Makes Coffins Your Size Too"
"The Shades"
"3 Less Problems"
"Capitol Circle"
"Do You Know (Acoustic)"
"Feeding The Rich (Acoustic)"
"Where Go We (Acoustic)"

Performers
Brandon Jordan - vocals, guitar
Dirty - bass
Duke - drums

Album information
Record label: Nine 12

Killradio albums
2008 EPs